Ataíde is a Portuguese surname. Notable people with the surname include:

 António de Ataíde (c.1500–1563), Portuguese nobleman and diplomat
 Elton Junior Melo Ataíde (born 1990), Brazilian footballer
 João Manuel de Ataíde (1570–1633), Portuguese bishop
 Manoel da Costa Ataíde (1762–1830), Brazilian painter and sculptor
 Martinho de Ataíde, 2nd Count of Atouguia (c. 1415 - 1499), Portuguese nobleman
 Pedro Manuel de Ataíde (1665–1722), Portuguese nobleman 
 Pêro de Ataíde (c.1450–1504), Portuguese naval captain and explorer
 Vasco de Ataíde (died c.1500), Portuguese naval captain and explorer
 Leonardo Ataíde (born 2004), Brazilian footballer

Portuguese-language surnames